Juan Antonio Arévalo (2 June 1935 – 2 August 2022) was a Spanish politician. 

Arévalo was born on 2 June 1935. He served as a member of the Senate of Spain from 1979 to 2000. Arévalo was a promoter of the bullfighting law in 1991. He died on 2 August 2022, at the age of 87.

References 

1935 births
2022 deaths
20th-century Spanish politicians
Members of the Senate of Spain
Spanish Socialist Workers' Party politicians